Henry Nichols Cobb (April 8, 1926 – March 2, 2020) was an American architect and founding partner with I.M. Pei and Eason H. Leonard of Pei Cobb Freed & Partners, an international architectural firm based in New York City.

Early life
Henry N. Cobb was born in Boston, Massachusetts, the son of Elsie Quincy (Nichols) and Charles Kane Cobb, an investment counselor. He attended Phillips Exeter Academy, Harvard College, and the Harvard University Graduate School of Design.

Career
Cobb was an architect. Additionally, he was the chairman of the Department of Architecture at Harvard University from 1980 to 1985. He received honorary degrees from Bowdoin College and the Swiss Federal Institute of Technology. In 1983, he was elected into the National Academy of Design as an Associate Academician, and became a full Academician in 1990. Cobb won the Council on Tall Buildings and Urban Habitat's 2013 Lynn S. Beedle Award, and was awarded the Architectural League of New York's President’s Medal in 2015.

Personal life and death
Cobb lived in New York City and North Haven, Maine. He died on March 2, 2020, in Manhattan at the age of 93.

Notable buildings 

Notable buildings for which Cobb was principally responsible include:
Place Ville Marie in Montreal (1962)
Campus of the State University of New York Fredonia (1968)
Harbor Towers, Boston (1971)
John Hancock Tower, Boston (1976)
Wilson Commons at the University of Rochester (1976)
World Trade Center, Baltimore (1977)
One Dallas Centre, Dallas (1979)
Johnson and Johnson Plaza, New Brunswick, New Jersey (1983)
ARCO Tower, Dallas (1983)
Charles Shipman Payson Building, Portland Museum of Art, Portland, Maine (1983)
Pitney Bowes World Headquarters, Stamford, Connecticut (1985)
Library Tower, Los Angeles (1989), now U.S. Bank Tower
Credit Suisse First Boston headquarters at Canary Wharf, London (1992)
UCLA Anderson School of Management at the University of California, Los Angeles (1995)
American Association for the Advancement of Science headquarters, Washington, D.C. (1996)
John Joseph Moakley United States Courthouse and Harborpark, Boston (1998)
College-Conservatory of Music at the University of Cincinnati (1999)
World Trade Center Barcelona, Barcelona (1999)
National Constitution Center, Philadelphia (2003)
Hyatt Center, Chicago (2005)
Palazzo Lombardia, Milan, Italy (2005)
International Monetary Fund Headquarters 2, Washington, D.C. (2005)
Center for Government and International Studies at Harvard University (2005)
1 Memorial Drive, Federal Reserve Bank of Kansas City (2008)
Torre Espacio, Madrid, Spain (2008)
200 West Street, New York (2009)
Palazzo Lombardia, Milan (2010)
 7 Bryant Park, New York (2016) 
Four Seasons Hotel & Private Residences, One Dalton Street, Boston (2019)

Gallery

Bibliography 
 Henry N. Cobb: Words & Works 1948-2018: Scenes from a Life in Architecture (2018). Monacelli Press. .

References

External links 
Cobb biography on website of Pei Cobb Freed & Partners
Thomas Farragher: Special Report on the Boston Globe; "The Hancock at 30" includes Henry Cobb audio slideshow (paywalled)

1926 births
2020 deaths
Architects from Boston
People from North Haven, Maine
Architects from New York City
Phillips Exeter Academy alumni
The Harvard Lampoon alumni
Harvard Graduate School of Design faculty
Harvard Graduate School of Design alumni
20th-century American architects
21st-century American architects
Harvard College alumni
Presidents of the American Academy of Arts and Letters